The 8"/35 caliber gun Mark 3 and Mark 4 (spoken "eight-inch-thirty-five--caliber") were used for the main batteries of the United States Navy's first armored cruisers and the secondary batteries for their first battleships, the . The 8"/40 caliber gun Mark 5 initially armed the  armored cruisers.

Mark 3
The Mark 3 Experimental was a 30 caliber gun that used trunnions and had 11 hoops with the outer hoop starting  from the breech and running out to the muzzle. The Mark 3s consisted of gun Nos. 9 – 27, 33 – 37, and 51. This gun was removed from service prior to World War I. The Mark 3 Mod 1 was constructed of tube, jacket and eight hoops while Mod 2 was identical to Mod 1 but with different steps under the chase hoops. Mod 3 was, for one gun, lengthened to 40 calibers and was removed from service prior to the start of World War I. Mod 4 was, also for one gun only, different from other Mods in having a ring shrunk onto the breech end, tapering the breech, and with a small balancing hoop screwed onto the front chase hoop. Mod 5 had the trunnions removed and the outer jacket threaded to accept a sleeve. Mod 6, gun Nos. 52 and 82 – 83, were constructed of nickel-steel in a simplified three-piece construction.

Mark 4
The Mark 4s were Nos. 22 – 32, 38 – 50, and 52 – 83. The original Mark 4 Mod 0 guns were identical to Mark 3 Mod 1 guns with the trunnion hoop and elevating band removed and with the threads formerly under the trunnion hoop being continued to the rear of the gun. This allowed these guns to be screwed into the sleeve of a two-gun turret mount. Mods 2 through 9 were for minor differences primarily for testing different mounting techniques. Mod 10 was for one gun cut down to 23 calibers and used for experimental work with high-explosive shells. Mod 11 was a Mod 4 gun, No. 72, with an alloy steel liner, uniformed rifling and modified chamber.

Mark 5
The Mark 5, Nos. 84 – 107, was a new 40 caliber design intended for armored cruisers and battleship secondaries and constructed of tube, jacket, three hoops and one locking ring. This gun had a muzzle bell. Unfortunately, the Mark 5 proved to be unable to handle the transition from black powder to nitrocellulose propellants as the new propellant burned more slowly, which allowed pressure to build up to unsafe levels as the projectile traveled down the bore. This problem was illustrated when  blew off the muzzle of one of her Mark 5 guns during gunnery practice off Chefoo, Shantung, on 22 June 1907. All Mark 5 guns were subsequently removed from service by 1908, lengthened to 45 calibers by adding a new liner and rehooped to the muzzle, redesignated as Mod 1 and then placed into reserve. Two of these Mod 1 guns were given a slightly different breech mechanism and gas seat and then designated as Mod 2. Pennsylvania-class cruisers were subsequently rearmed with the stronger 8-in/45 caliber Mark 6 guns.

Naval Service

See also
 8-inch gun M1888 - Army gun of similar type and era

Notes

References

Books
 
Online sources

External links
 Bluejackets Manual, 1917, 4th revision: US Navy 14-inch Mark 1 gun

 

Naval guns of the United States
203 mm artillery